is a Japanese professional footballer who plays as a defensive midfielder for Primeira Liga club Sporting CP and the Japan national team.

Career

Kawasaki Frontale 
In 2018, Morita joined Kawasaki Frontale. On February 10, he made his professional debut as a substitute in the Japanese Super Cup against Cerezo Osaka. On April 14, he made his first start in the league match against Vegalta Sendai. After that, he managed to secure an active role in the team, and they would go on to win the J1 League title in 2018. In 2020, he was selected in the J-League Best Eleven, along with 8 other Kawasaki players as they would win the J1 League title again.

CD Santa Clara 
On 8 January 2021, it was announced that Morita would sign for Portuguese club CD Santa Clara, in the Primeira Liga. When he made his debut on 25 January, he netted his first goal for the club, scoring the winner in the 89th minute of a 2–1 victory over Rio Ave.

Sporting CP 
On 1 July 2022, it was announced that he would join Sporting CP on a permanent transfer. He would go on to make his debut for the club against SC Braga on 7 August. On 7 September, he made his Champions League debut against Eintracht Frankfurt. On 30 September, he scored his first goal for the club in a win against Gil Vicente.

International career 
On 2 September 2018, Ryota Oshima and Hotaru Yamaguchi withdrew from the national team due to injury, so Morita was called up to the Japanese national team in their place for the first time in his first year as a professional. He made his national team debut on 11 September, coming on against Costa Rica, the first game under new coach Hajime Moriyasu.

In January 2019, he was called up to the Japanese national team for the AFC Asian Cup 2019 but withdrew due to injury.

In March 2021, he was called up to the national team for the first time in just under two years, and on 30 March, he scored his first goal for the national team in a 14–0 win against Mongolia in the 2022 FIFA World Cup Asian Qualifiers.

On 1 November 2022, Morita was named in the Japan squad for the 2022 FIFA World Cup in Qatar.

Career statistics

Club

International

Scores and results list Japan's goal tally first, score column indicates the score after each Morita goal.

Honours
Kawasaki Frontale
J1 League: 2018, 2020
Emperor's Cup: 2020
J.League Cup: 2019
Japanese Super Cup: 2019

Individual
J.League Best XI: 2020

References

External links

1995 births
Living people
People from Takatsuki, Osaka
Ryutsu Keizai University alumni
Association football people from Osaka Prefecture
Japanese footballers
Association football midfielders
Japan international footballers
J1 League players
Primeira Liga players
Kawasaki Frontale players
C.D. Santa Clara players
Sporting CP footballers
Japanese expatriate footballers
Japanese expatriate sportspeople in Portugal
Expatriate footballers in Portugal
2022 FIFA World Cup players